Seán Treacy's GAA may refer to:

 Seán Treacy's GAA (Tipperary), a sports club in the Slieve Felim Hills of Ireland
 Seán Treacy's HC (Armagh), a hurling club
 Seán Treacy's HC (London), a hurling club in England